Alain Richard (born 29 August 1945) is a French politician serving as Senator for Val-d'Oise since 2011. A member of the National Assembly for Val-d'Oise from 1978 to 1993, he was elected to the Senate in 1995 before his appointment as Minister of Defence in 1997 under Prime Minister Lionel Jospin, an office he retained until 2002. A former member of the Socialist Party (SP), he joined La République En Marche! (LREM) in 2017.

Career
Alain Richard received his Baccalauréat at the Lycée Henri-IV. He is an alumnus of Sciences Po and the École nationale d'administration (ÉNA). He was first elected as Mayor of Saint-Ouen-l'Aumône in 1977. In 1981, he was selected to be one of the first Young Leaders of the French-American Foundation. A member of the Socialist Party (PS), he was elected to the National Assembly in the 1978 election.

Elected to the Senate in 1995 election, he was appointed Minister of Defence two years later by President Jacques Chirac. Seen as an ally of Prime Minister Lionel Jospin, he left the office when Jean-Pierre Raffarin became Prime Minister in 2002. Richard went back to his initial position as Mayor of Saint-Ouen-l'Aumône, before regaining a seat in the Senate in the 2011 election. He was reelected in 2017 as a member of La République En Marche! (LREM).

Honors
  Order of Propitious Clouds with Special Grand Cordon (2021)

References

External links
Page on the Senate website

1945 births
Living people
Politicians from Paris
Unified Socialist Party (France) politicians
Socialist Party (France) politicians
La République En Marche! politicians
French Ministers of Defence
Deputies of the 6th National Assembly of the French Fifth Republic
Deputies of the 7th National Assembly of the French Fifth Republic
Deputies of the 8th National Assembly of the French Fifth Republic
Deputies of the 9th National Assembly of the French Fifth Republic
French Senators of the Fifth Republic
Senators of Val-d'Oise
Mayors of places in Île-de-France
Lycée Henri-IV alumni
Sciences Po alumni
École nationale d'administration alumni
Members of the Conseil d'État (France)
Young Leaders of the French-American Foundation
Recipients of the Order of Propitious Clouds
Members of Parliament for Val-d'Oise